Better Call Saul is an American television series.

Better Call Saul may also refer to:
 "Better Call Saul" (Breaking Bad), an episode of Breaking Bad
 "Better Call Saul" (Homeland), an episode of Homeland

See also 
 Breaking Bad (disambiguation)